Manuel Humberto Cota Jiménez (born 2 March 1961) is a Mexican politician affiliated with the PRI. He served as Senator of the LXII Legislature of the Mexican Congress representing Nayarit and as a member of the Chamber of Deputies during the LXI Legislature.

References

1961 births
Living people
Politicians from Tepic, Nayarit
Institutional Revolutionary Party politicians
Members of the Senate of the Republic (Mexico)
Members of the Chamber of Deputies (Mexico)
21st-century Mexican politicians
Municipal presidents of Tepic
Autonomous University of Nayarit alumni
Members of the Congress of Nayarit
Senators of the LXII and LXIII Legislatures of Mexico